The Innocent  is the seventh stand-alone novel by American crime writer, Harlan Coben.  The novel was first published in April, 2005.

The novel was made into a Spanish television miniseries of the same name that was released on Netflix in April, 2021.

Plot summary
Matt Hunter is a seemingly ordinary man in suburban New Jersey with a pregnant wife, Olivia. But Matt's past is not so ordinary. In his late teens, Matt tried to break up a fight involving his friend, and wound up unintentionally killing the other fighter. While his friends spent time in college, Matt was behind bars serving time for negligent manslaughter. Now nine years after being released from prison, Matt is a paralegal in his brother's law firm and his life is looking up. However, the past won't seem to go away. As Matt and Olivia try to buy a house in his old neighborhood, neighbors and local authorities make it clear he is not welcome. After Matt receives disturbing photos from his wife's phone, a man who is tailing Matt ends up dead. Matt soon learns that Olivia also has a past that she'd like to forget. Unable to trust anyone, Matt and Olivia are forced to work outside the law to save themselves and their future.

References

Novels by Harlan Coben
2005 American novels
E. P. Dutton books
Orion Books books
American mystery novels
American thriller novels
American novels adapted into television shows